Tread is a 2019 American documentary film directed by Paul Solet. It premiered at the South by Southwest film festival in March 2019 and to limited theatres and on Netflix on February 28, 2020.

Synopsis 
American welder Marvin Heemeyer goes on a violent rampage with a secretly fortified bulldozer made up of steel, concrete, and guns after feuding with members of the small town of Granby, Colorado.

Reception 
The film was positively reviewed and has  approval rating, based on  reviews on Rotten Tomatoes.

References

External links 
 

2019 documentary films
2019 films
American documentary films
Documentary films about violence
Documentary films about Colorado
Grand County, Colorado
Bulldozers
2010s English-language films
Films directed by Paul Solet
2010s American films